Luther F. "Fred" Carter (born May 30, 1950) is an American university president and a former senior governmental official. He is the 4th President of Francis Marion University in Florence, South Carolina.  He assumed office in 1999.

Early life
Carter was raised in Sanford, Florida.  He completed a Bachelor of Arts in Political Science at the University of Central Florida in 1972 and earned a commission as a second lieutenant in the United States Marine Corps. While at UCF he joined Tau Kappa Epsilon fraternity. Carter spent three years as an active duty Marine officer and 26 years as an officer in the United States Marine Corps Reserve. He retired in 2001 with the rank of colonel.

Academic career
Carter completed a Masters in Public Administration at the University of South Carolina (USC) in 1976 and completed his Doctorate in Political Science at USC in 1979. Carter began his academic teaching career as an assistant professor and director of internship at Western Kentucky University from 1979-80. He was an assistant professor and director of masters of public policy program, Department of Public Service Administration at the University of Central Florida from 1980–81; served as the director of the Institute of Public Affairs and Policy Studies, MPA Director and associate professor of political science at the College of Charleston from 1981–85; then served as the chair of the Department of Political Science at the College of Charleston from 1985-87. Carter was named president of Francis Marion University in 1999. Carter is the author or co-author of six books and dozens of articles and reviews in his field.

Public Service Career
Carter served as the county administrator for Bamberg County, S.C. in 1977. Following a distinguished 10-year career in academics, Carter was selected as the senior executive assistant to South Carolina Governor Carroll Campbell, where he served as a principal policy advisor on governmental finance and grants, higher education, public safety, and local government. From 1991-1999, Carter served as executive director of the South Carolina Budget Control Board (now the Department of Administration), where he coordinated the activities of the 1,500 employees of the board and provided oversight to a vast array of government functions. Carter served as chief of staff to South Carolina Governor Mark Sanford in 2003, acting as the primary advisor and coordinator of the 14 gubernatorial cabinet departments during the inaugural year of Sanford's administration.

At Francis Marion University
Carter is the longest-serving president in the history of Francis Marion University. His tenure has been marked by vastly improved shared governance at the university, dramatic increases in fundraising and fiscal stability, warm relations with local government and civic organizations, and ongoing growth in the university's academic offerings. Carter has presided over the construction of 13 new buildings including the award-winning FMU Performing Arts Center in downtown Florence and has guided the development of new programs in Nursing, Engineering, the Health Sciences and more. He was inducted into Omicron Delta Kappa as a faculty/staff initiate in 2009. In August 2018, FMU's Board of Trustees extended Carter's contract through 2023.

Civic Involvement
During his multi-faceted career, Carter has been appointed to numerous public and private boards, committees and task forces. Highlights include: Winthrop College Board of Trustees (1988-1993),Joint Legislative Study Committee on State Employee Merit Pay, S.C. General Assembly (1988-
1989), State of South Carolina Hurricane Hugo Relief Fund (1989-1990-Director), S.C. Economic Recovery Commission (1989-1990-secretary), S.C. Emergency Management Advisory Council (1990-1991-Chairman), Governor's School for the Arts and Humanities Steering Committee (1993),
Member, Legislative Task Force on S.C. Infrastructure Needs (1995-1996), South Carolina-Brandenburg, Germany Sister State Coordinating Committee (1993-1999-Chairman)
Co-Leader, Atlantic Council Delegation to Rheinland-Pfalz, Germany (1994-1999), Member, South Carolina Research Authority Board of Directors (1999–Present; Executive Committee
2017–Present),SCANA Advisory Board (2000-2012), S.C. Bar Association’s Commission for an Independent Judiciary (2001–Present), Presidential Appointee, Commission on White House Fellowships (2001-2004), Board of Trustees, Carolinas Hospital Systems (2003–Present), Greater Florence Chamber of Commerce (2011–12; 2016-17-Chairman),Board of Directors, South Carolina Institute of Medicine and Public Health (2012-2016-Chairman), Legislative Study Committee on Higher Education Efficiency and Effectiveness- University
Presidents’ Representative (2014-2015), Governor’s Medical Graduate Education Council (2015–Present-Chairman)

Awards
Recipient of the Donato Pugliese Award by the Southeast Conference on Public Administration for
enduring contributions "in furthering the art, process and science of administration"(1987), recipient of the South Carolina Governor's Order of the Palmetto (1991), recipient Doctor of Humane Letters Degree, College of Charleston (1992), recipient, Commanders Cross with Star Award, Order of St. Stanislas (1993), recipient S.C. Association of Regional Councils’ Public Official of the Year Award (1994), recipient Doctor of Humanities Degree, Lander University (1998), recipient University of Central Florida’s Distinguished Alumnus Award (1999), recipient, Doctor of Humane Letters Degree, The Citadel (2000), recipient South Carolina State Chamber of Commerce’s Public Servant of the Year Award (2003), recipient, South Carolina Humanities Council’s Governor’s Award in the Humanities (2004), recipient, University of South Carolina, College of Arts and Sciences’ Distinguished Graduate Alumnus
Award (2006).

Personal life
He and his wife, Folly, have two children, Luke and Bryan.

References

1950 births
Living people